The 2007 European Junior Curling Challenge was held from January 2 to January 6, 2007, in Tårnby, Denmark.

Junior Men

Teams Group A

Teams Group B

Results

Group A

3 January 2007

Standings

Group B

2 January 2007

3 January 2007

Standings

Junior Women

Teams

Results

2 January

3 January

Standings

References

External links
Official website

European Junior Curling Challenge
European Junior Curling Challenge
European Junior Curling Challenge
International curling competitions hosted by Denmark